This is a list of University of Bonn people including people who have taught or studied at the University of Bonn

Nobel laureates
 Reinhard Genzel – 2020 Nobel Prize in Physics
 "for the discovery of a supermassive compact object at the centre of our galaxy"
 Harald zur Hausen – 2008 Nobel Prize in Physiology or Medicine
 "for his discovery of human papilloma viruses causing cervical cancer"
 Reinhard Selten – 1994 Nobel Prize in Economics
 "for their pioneering analysis of equilibria in the theory of non-cooperative games"
 Wolfgang Paul – 1989 Nobel Prize in Physics
 "for the development of the ion trap technique"
 Luigi Pirandello – 1934 Nobel Prize in Literature
 "for his bold and ingenious revival of dramatic and scenic art"
 Otto Wallach – 1910 Nobel Prize in Chemistry
 "in recognition of his services to organic chemistry and the chemical industry by his pioneer work in the field of alicyclic compounds"
 Paul Johann Ludwig von Heyse – 1910 Nobel Prize in Literature
 "as a tribute to the consummate artistry, permeated with idealism, which he has demonstrated during his long productive career as a lyric poet, dramatist, novelist and writer of world-renowned short stories"
 Philipp Lenard – 1905 Nobel Prize in Physics
 "for his work on cathode rays"

Fields Medalists
 Maryna Viazovska - 2022 Fields Medal
 "for the proof that the E8 lattice provides the densest packing of identical spheres in 8 dimensions, and further contributions to related extremal problems and interpolation problems in Fourier analysis"
 Peter Scholze – 2018 Fields Medal
 "for transforming arithmetic algebraic geometry over p-adic fields through his introduction of perfectoid spaces, with application to Galois representations, and for the development of new cohomology theories"
 Maxim Kontsevich – 1998 Fields Medal
 "for his contributions to four problems of Geometry"
 Gerd Faltings – 1986 Fields Medal
 "for his proof of the Mordell Conjecture"

Faculty

 Friedrich Wilhelm August Argelander (1799–1875), Astronomy
 Ernst Moritz Arndt (1769–1860), History
 Karl Barth (1886–1968), Theology
 Bruno Bauer (1809–1882) Theology
 Carl Heinrich Becker (1876–1933), Oriental Philology
 Karl Dietrich Bracher (born 1922), Political Science
 Franz Bücheler (1837–1908), Classics
 Friedrich Calker (1790–1870), Philosophy
 Constantin Carathéodory, (1873–1850) Mathematics
 Rudolf Julius Emanuel Clausius (1822–1888), Physics
 Ernst Robert Curtius (1886–1956), Romance Literature
 Friedrich Christian Diez (1794–1876), Philology
 Christian Drosten (born 1972), Head of the Charité Institute of Virology, Virology 
 Benno Erdmann (1898–1909), Philosophy
 Udo di Fabio (born 1954), member of the Federal Constitutional Court of Germany since 1999, Law
 Gerd Faltings (born 1954), Mathematics
 Alexander Filippou (born 1958), Professor of Inorganic Chemistry
 Heinrich Geißler (1814–1879), Physics
 Felix Hausdorff (1868–1942), Mathematics
 Hermann von Helmholtz (1821–1894), Medicine and Physics
 Georg Hermes (1775–1831), Theology
 Heinrich Hertz (1857–1894), Physics
 Werner Hildenbrand (born 1936), Economics
 Friedrich Hirzebruch (born 1927), Mathematics
 Manfred Hutter (born 1957), Religious studies
 Marek Karpinski (born 1948), Computer Science, Mathematics
 Gottfried Kinkel (1815–1882), History
 Wilhelm Krelle (1916–2004), Economics
 Walther Kruse (1864–1943), Bacteriology
 Christian Lassen (1800–1876), Oriental Philology
 Maria von Linden, (1869–1936), first female Professor
 Rudolf Lipschitz, (1832–1903), Mathematics
 Werner Meyer-Eppler (1913–1960), Phonetics
 Barthold Georg Niebuhr, (1776–1831) History
 Martin Noth (1902–1968), Theology
 Felix Otto (born 1966), Mathematics
 Wolfgang Paul (1913–1993), Physics
 Carl Adam Petri (born 1926), Mathematics
 Wilhelm Pfeffer (1845–1920), Botany
 Eduard Friedrich Wilhelm Pflüger (1829–1910), Physiology
 Alfred Philippson (1864–1953), Geology and Geography
 Julius Plücker (1801–1868), Mathematics and Physics
 Joseph Ratzinger (born 1927), Pope, Theology
 Ferdinand von Richthofen (1833–1905), Geology
 Friedrich Wilhelm Ritschl (1806–1876), Classics
 Walter Schellenberg (born 1929), Law
 Rudolf Schieffer (1947–2018), Medieval history
 Annemarie Schimmel (1922–2003), Oriental Philology
 August Wilhelm Schlegel (1767–1845), Philosophy
 Bernhard Schlink (born 1944), Law
 Johannes Schmidt (1843–1901), Linguistics
 Carl Schmitt (1888–1985), Law
 Arnold Schönhage (born 1934), Mathematics
 Joseph Schumpeter (1883–1950), Economics
 Reinhard Selten (born 1930), Economics
 Karl Simrock (1802–1872), German Studies
 Heinrich Freiherr von Stackelberg (1905–1946), Economics
 Friedrich August Kekulé von Stradonitz (1829–1896), Chemistry
 Eduard Strasburger (1844–1912), Botany
 Heinrich von Sybel (1817–1895), History
 Otto Toeplitz (1881–1940), Mathematics
 Carl Troll (1899–1975), Geography
 Hermann Karl Usener (1834–1905), Classics
 Otto Wallach (1847–1931), Chemistry
 Axel A. Weber (born 1957), President of the Deutsche Bundesbank since 2004, Economics
 Walter Weizel (1901–1982), Physics
 Ernst August Weiß (1900–1942), Mathematics

Alumni

A 

 Heinrich Friedrich Otto Abel 
 Sigurd Abel
 Charles McLaren, 1st Baron Aberconway 
 Marylyn Addo
 Konrad Adenauer
 Hans-Henning Adler
 Samuel Adler (rabbi) 
 Mary Agria
 Irene Zoe Alameda 
 Wolfgang Albers (police president)
 Albert of Saxony 
 Barbara Albert (chemist) 
 Karl Albert 
 Albert, Prince Consort 
 Alexis, Prince of Bentheim and Steinfurt 
 Syed Mujtaba Ali 
 Julius Althaus
 Margaret Altmann 
 Johann Baptist Alzog 
 Juozas Ambrazevičius 
 Katajun Amirpur
 Andreas Reckwitz 
 Hugo Andresen 
 Ernst Anrich 
 Richard Anschütz
 John Antoniadis
 Hans-Jürgen Appelrath 
 Jürgen Aschoff 
 Ludwig Aschoff
 Jörg Asmussen 
 Erna Auerbach

B 

 Johannes Theodor Baargeld 
 Emil Baehrens 
 Hans Werner Ballmann 
 Johann Baptista Baltzer 
 Christian Bär
 Otto Bardenhewer 
 Norbert Bartel
 Sandra Bartky 
 Bartłomiej Wróblewski 
 Tung Pao-cheng
 Wolf Bauer 
 Bettina Baumgärtel
 Theodor Baums 
 Canan Bayram 
 Hermann Heinrich Becker 
 Max Joseph Becker 
 Carl Traugott Beilschmied 
 Anna Benaki-Psarouda 
 Hans Bender 
 Otto Benndorf 
 Max Bense
 Friedrich von Berg
 Alexander Berghaus 
 Anton Berlage
 Jakob Bernays 
 Michael Bernays 
 Carlos Bertulani 
 Erich Bethe 
 Peter Beyer (politician) 
 Willibald Beyschlag 
 Ernst Bickel 
 Margarete Bieber 
 August Daniel von Binzer
 Karl Hermann Bitter
 Matthew Black
 Friedrich Blass
 Orrin Dubbs Bleakley
 Wilhelm Bleek
 Gisela Bleibtreu-Ehrenberg
 Raimund Bleischwitz
 Immanuel Bloch
 Joachim Blüher
 Norbert Blüm
 Clemens Blume
 Johann Jakob Blumer
 Franz Boas
 Eduard Böcking
 Wilhelm Boden
 Friedrich Simon Bodenheimer
 Henning von Boehmer
 Alberto Boerger
 Albrecht von Boeselager
 Peter van Bohlen
 Emil du Bois-Reymond
 Wilhelm Bölsche
 Heinrich Bone
 Alfred Maximilien Bonnet
 Beatrix Borchard
 Eugen Bormann
 Gustav Jacob Born
 Axel Börsch-Supan
 Karl Borsch
 Hermann Bottenbruch
 Michael Brand (politician)
 Helmut Brandt
 Alexis Brasseur
 August Brauer
 Hermann Breymann
 Götz Briefs
 Egbert Brieskorn
 Klaus Brockhoff
 Caspar Max Brosius
 Heike Brötz-Oesterhelt
 Hermann Brück
 Heinrich Brüning
 Markus Brunnermeier
 Claudia Maria Buch
 Karl Bücher
 Edith Bülbring
 Jacob Burckhardt
 Volker Burkert
 Wolfram Burgard
 Karl Butzer

C 

 Otto von Camphausen
 Petre P. Carp
 Winifred Cavenagh
 Victor Cherbuliez
 Prince Christian of Schleswig-Holstein
 Kypros Chrysostomides
 Somyot Chueathai
 Rainer Ludwig Claisen
 Campbell Clarke
 Johannes Classen
 Carl Clemen
 Franz Jakob Clemens
 Charles P. Clever
 Michael Clyne
 Pierre Colas
 Jörg Colberg
 Alexander Eugen Conrady
 Julian Coolidge
 Corps Borussia Bonn
 Pascal Costanza
 John Adam Cramb
 Ronald Crutcher
 Otto Cuntz

D

 Hermann von Dechend
 Otto Deiters
 Hans Delbrück
 Eva Demmerle
 Alastair Denniston
 Carrie Derick
 Bärbel Dieckmann
 Hermann Alexander Diels
 Paul Diepgen
 Harold Dillon, 17th Viscount Dillon
 Karl Dilthey
 Peter Gustav Lejeune Dirichlet
 Alexander zu Dohna-Schlobitten (1899–1997)
 Anton Dohrn
 Hilde Domin
 Hans Adam Dorten
 Markus Dröge
 Erich von Drygalski
 Konrad Duden
 Friedrich von Duhn
 Ernst Dümmler
 Maximilian Wolfgang Duncker
 Johann Heinrich Joseph Düntzer
 Khalid Duran
 William West Durant
 Nikolai Durov
 Aramesh Dustdar
 Karl Franz Otto Dziatzko

E

 Hermann Ebbinghaus
 Martin Eberts
 Hendrik Elias
 Alexander Ellinger
 Robert Elsie
 Anton Elter
 Tom Enders
 Adolph Albrecht Erlenmeyer
 Ernst August Weiß
 Max Ernst
 Jan Esper
 Walter Eucken
 Botho zu Eulenburg
 August Everding

F

 Anton Fahne
 Heino Falcke
 Constantin Fasolt
 Markus Feldenkirchen
 Wilfried Feldenkirchen
 Michael F. Feldkamp
 Julius von Ficker
 Frank Findeiß
 Wolfgang Finkelnburg
 Bernhard Fischer-Wasels
 Anton Hubert Fischer
 Emil Fischer
 Karsten Fischer (political scientist)
 Theobald Fischer
 William Roby Fletcher
 Tina van de Flierdt
 Florika Fink-Hooijer
 Dieter Fox
 Wolfgang Bernhard Fränkel
 Fritz Frech
 Frederick Francis II, Grand Duke of Mecklenburg-Schwerin
 Frederick III, German Emperor
 Wilhelm von Freeden
 Josef Frenken
 Solomon Frensdorff
 Carl Remigius Fresenius
 Angela D. Friederici
 Julius Friedländer (numismatist)
 Prince Friedrich Karl of Prussia (1828–1885)
 Johann Carl Fuhlrott

G

 Nina Gantert
 Harald Garcke
 Wilhelm von Gayl
 Emanuel Geibel
 Abraham Geiger
 Lazarus Geiger
 Reinhard Genzel
 Alfred Gercke
 Erich Gerhards
 Pradyut Ghosh
 Johann Gildemeister
 Basil Lanneau Gildersleeve
 Cemile Giousouf
 Frank Glaw
 John J. Glennon
 Hans Globke
 Joseph Goebbels
 Hans Rupprecht Goette
 Leah Goldberg
 Levin Goldschmidt
 Theodor Goldstücker
 Helmut Gollwitzer
 Heinrich Ernst Göring
 Guido Görres
 Hermann Heinrich Gossen
 Alfred Gottschalk (biochemist)
 Lothar Göttsche
 Ernst Götzinger
 Willi Graf
 Heinrich Wilhelm Grauert
 Henry Green (MP for Poplar)
 Theodore F. Green
 Karl Gottlieb Grell
 Hans von der Groeben
 Detlef Gromoll
 Bernhard Gröschel
 Klaus Groth
 Martin Grötschel
 Nikolai Grube
 Heinrich Grüber
 Monika Grütters
 Herlind Gundelach

H

 Harald Haarmann
 Michaela Haas
 Julius von Haast
 Jürgen Habermas
 Birke Häcker
 Johann Georg Hagen
 Jürgen von Hagen
 Heinz Halm
 Ursula Hamenstädt
 Muhammad Hamidullah
 Han Young-sil
 Joseph Hansen (historian)
 Michael E. Hansen
 Albert Harkness
 Robert Almer Harper
 Eva Harth
 Robert Hartmeyer
 Martin Haug
 Prosper de Haulleville
 Harald zur Hausen
 Bodo Hauser
 Martina Havenith-Newen
 D. E. L. Haynes
 Matthias Heider
 Heinrich Heine
 Karl Heinzen
 Eduard Heis
 Wolfgang Helbig
 Ernst Wilhelm Hengstenberg
 Friedrich Gustav Jakob Henle
 Kurt Hensel
 Ferdinand Ludwig Herff
 Ferdinand A. Hermens
 Richard Hertwig
 Laura Herz
 Gerd Heusch
 Friedrich Heusler
 Ludwig Heusner
 Ahmad Ali Heydari
 Paul Heyse
 Raymond Hickey
 Bernhard Josef Hilgers
 Hilmar Duerbeck
 George Him
 Samson Raphael Hirsch
 Samuel Hirsch
 Winifred Hoernlé
 Jacobus Henricus van 't Hoff
 August Heinrich Hoffmann von Fallersleben
 Hubertus Hoffmann
 Dean Hoge
 Alfred Holder
 Joachim Wilhelm Franz Philipp von Holtzendorff
 Karl Holzamer
 Axel Honneth
 Karl Hopf
 Ernst Höpfner
 Josef Hopmann
 How to Dress Well
 Emil Hübner
 Hermann Hüffer
 William Wilson Hunter
 Rene Hurlemann

I

 Mario Germán Iguarán Arana
 Johannes Ilberg
 Wolfgang Ischinger
 Caspar Isenkrahe
 Otto Ites

J

 Abraham Jacobi
 Paul Jacobsthal
 Gottlieb von Jagow
 Gottlieb Heinrich Georg Jahr
 Johannes Janssen
 Jens Carsten Jantzen
 Sheila Jasanoff
 Anton Saurma von der Jeltsch
 Ronald Jensen
 Wilhelm Joest
 John Hennig
 Henri Jordan
 Jürgen Jost
 Kurt Josten
 Ju Gau-jeng
 James Robertson Justice

K

 Bruno Kahl
 Paul E. Kahle
 Kamyar Kalantar-Zadeh
 August Kalkmann
 Karekin II
 Georg Karo
 Gustav Karsten
 Hermann Karsten (physicist)
 Alexander Kaufmann
 Eduard Kaufmann
 Ralph Kaufmann
 Franz Philip Kaulen
 Ulrich Kelber
 Otto Keller (philologist)
 Klaus Kern
 İhsan Ketin
 John Killick
 Klaus Kinkel
 Alfred Kirchhoff
 Kittisak Prokati
 Felix Klein
 Volkmar Klein
 Onno Klopp
 Adolf Klügmann
 Hans Knappertsbusch
 Karl-Rudolf Koch
 Wolfgang Köhler
 Otto Kohlrausch
 Albert von Kölliker
 Maxim Kontsevich
 Bärbel Koribalski
 Dieter Kotschick
 Otto Kranzbühler
 Matthias Kreck
 Josef Kreiner
 Heinrich Kreutz
 August David Krohn
 Ernst Kromayer
 Hermann Krukenberg
 Heinrich Kruse
 Felix Kübler
 Heinz Kunert
 Aenne Kurowski-Schmitz
 Annette Kurschus
 Johann Heinrich Kurtz
 Ernst Georg Ferdinand Küster

L

 Alexander Graf Lambsdorff
 Otto Graf Lambsdorff
 George Martin Lane
 Johann Peter Lange
 Joseph Langen
 Richard Laqueur
 Ernst von Lasaulx
 Armin Laschet
 Christian Lassen
 Barbour Lathrop
 Thomas Laubach
 Georg von Laubmann
 Sabine Lautenschläger
 Kartar Lalvani
 Philip Le Couteur
 Lee Yuan-tsu
 Olaf Lechtenfeld
 Max Lehmann
 Robert Lehr
 Ursula Lehr
 Paul Lejeune-Jung
 Max Lenz
 William Ellery Leonard
 Gerd Leonhard
 Oliver Lepsius
 Harald Lesch
 Erich Leschke
 Paul Leser
 Robert Ley
 Justus von Liebig
 Peter Liese
 Justin von Linde
 Daniel Lindemann
 Christian Lindner
 Christiane Löhr
 Hanns Christian Löhr
 Detlef Lohse
 Paul Lorenzen
 Joseph Lortz
 August Lösch
 Otto Lowenstein
 Wilhelm Lübke
 Robert Bulwer-Lytton, 1st Earl of Lytton

M

 Hans-Georg Maaßen
 Ulrike Malmendier
 Bernhard Mann
 Thilo Marauhn
 Karl Marx
 Wilhelm Marx
 Angus Matheson
 Friedrich Matz
 Axel Maußen
 Alexandru Mavrodi
 Hans Mayer
 Hans Meerwein
 Mehmet Celal Bey
 Johann Wilhelm Meigen
 Friedrich Meinecke
 Anton Menge
 Heinrich Theodor Menke
 Wolfgang Menzel
 Joseph von Mering
 Friedrich Merz
 John Theodore Merz
 Ioan Meșotă
 Ernst Messerschmid
 Werner Meyer-Eppler
 Andreas Meyer-Lindenberg
 Alfred Meyer
 Eduard Meyer
 Hugo Miehe
 Antonio Milošoski
 Julius von Mirbach
 Jürgen Mittelstraß
 Otto Gottlieb Mohnike
 Paul Moldenhauer
 Freya von Moltke
 Albert Mooren
 John Daniel Morell
 Christoph Moufang
 Hans Müller (politician)
 John Muir (indologist)
 Johannes Peter Müller
 Nicole Müller (linguist)
 Peter Müller (politician)
 Hermann Mutschmann

N

 Andrea Nahles
 Jürgen Neukirch
 Stephen Ng
 James Nicol
 William H. Nienhauser, Jr.
 Benedikt Niese
 Barbara Niethammer
 Friedrich Nietzsche
 Georg Nöldeke
 Carl von Noorden
 Eduard Norden

O 

 Axel Ockenfels
 George Ogilvie-Forbes
 Sjur Olsnes
 Hermann Oppenheim
 Gustav Solomon Oppert
 Johannes Orth
 Felix Otto (mathematician)
 Johannes Overbeck
 Adolf Overweg

P 

 Hermann Pabst
 Spiridon Palauzov
 Herbert Edward Palmer
 Raimon Panikkar
 Ludwig von Pastor
 Christian Patermann
 Friedrich Paulsen
 Hermann Pauly
 Heinz-Otto Peitgen
 Grigol Peradze
 Erich Pernice
 Georg Perthes
 Tilman Pesch
 Norbert Peters (priest)
 Eugen Petersen
 Friedbert Pflüger
 Friedrich Philippi (historian)
 Alfred Philippson
 Claus Pias
 Monika Piazzesi
 Amé Pictet
 Luigi Pirandello
 Frederik Pleitgen
 Hans-Gert Pöttering
 William Thierry Preyer
 George Prothero
 Eugen Prym

Q 
 Nicolae Quintescu

R 

 Julius Eckhardt Raht
 Uta Ranke-Heinemann
 Rolf Rannacher
 Gerhard vom Rath
 Augustus Rauschenbusch
 Udo Recker
 Friedrich Daniel von Recklinghausen
 Henry Regnery
 Anton Reicha
 August Reichensperger
 August Reifferscheid
 Joseph Hubert Reinkens
 Adolf Remelé
 Alfred von Reumont
 Franz Heinrich Reusch
 Otto Ribbeck
 Franz Richarz
 Eugen Richter
 Hans Riegel
 Charles Pierre Henri Rieu
 Matthias Ring
 Gerhard Ringel
 Albrecht Ritschl
 Otto Ritschl
 Franz Ritter
 Emil Ritterling
 Robert Kurt Woetzel
 Erwin Rohde
 Hermann von Rohden
 Gustaf Otto Rosenberg
 Norbert Röttgen
 Gerhard Charles Rump

S 

 Jörg-Rüdiger Sack
 Karl Ludwig Fridolin von Sandberger
 Raymond Sandover
 Thilo Sarrazin
 Lisa Sauermann
 Rudolf Scharping
 Nina Scheer
 Walter Schellenberg
 Alexander Jacob Schem
 Rudolf Schieffer
 Jakob Schipper
 August Schleicher
 Sigismund von Schlichting
 Johannes Schmidt (linguist)
 Klaus M. Schmidt
 Viktor Schmieden
 Franz August Schmölders
 Erhard Scholz
 Peter Scholze
 Gustav von Schönberg
 Ludwig Schopen
 Julius Schubring
 Adolf Schulten
 Hugo Paul Friedrich Schulz
 Franz Eilhard Schulze
 Hagen Schulze
 E. F. Schumacher
 Robert Schuman
 Carl Schurz
 Carl August Wilhelm Schwacke
 Irmgard Schwaetzer
 Gustav Schwalbe
 Joseph Schwane
 Theodor Schwann
 Karl Schwarz
 Hans Schwerdtfeger
 Joachim Schwermer
 George Douglas-Hamilton, 10th Earl of Selkirk
 William Seton
 Jürgen Seydel
 Marwan al-Shehhi
 Bernd Siebert
 Carl Siegfried
 Hermann Simon (manager)
 Karl Joseph Simrock
 Eduard von Simson
 Robert Skeris
 Ronald Smelser
 Richard Smyth (minister)
 Theodor Sparkuhl
 Friedrich von Spiegel
 Friedrich Spielhagen
 Jan Michael Sprenger
 Friedrich Staub
 Michael Stausberg
 Angelika Steger
 Wolfgang Steglich
 Roderich Stintzing
 Karlheinz Stockhausen
 Karl-Otto Stöhr
 Monika Stolz
 Eduard Strasburger
 Julius Strasburger
 Hendrik Streeck
 Adolf Strodtmann
 Siegfried Sudhaus
 Uwe Sunde
 Heinrich von Sybel
 Ludwig von Sybel

T 

 Atif Tauqeer
 Sabriye Tenberken
 Michael Theobald
 Insa Thiele-Eich
 Hugo Thielen
 Günther Thomann
 Sebastian Thrun
 Hans Tietmeyer
 Adolf Tobler
 Jan Peter Toennies
 Ferdinand Tönnies
 Peter E. Toschek
 James W. Treffinger
 Heinrich von Treitschke
 Heinrich Trettner

U 

 Horst Ueberhorst
 Gustav Uhlig
 Jacob Utsch

V 

 Johannes Vahlen
 Rüdiger Valk
 Willi Veller
 Günter Verheugen
 Friedrich Heinrich Vering
 Maryna Viazovska
 Eva Viehmann
 Franz Volhard
 Friedrich Vollmer
 Andreas von Antropoff

W 

 Curt Wachsmuth
 Hermann Friedrich Waesemann
 Henry Wakefield (bishop of Birmingham)
 Norbert Walter-Borjans
 George Washington (inventor)
 Wilhelm Wattenbach
 Alfred Weber
 Batty Weber
 Karl Otto Weber
 Max Carl Wilhelm Weber
 Otto Weber (theologian)
 Franz Gerhard Wegeler
 Hans-Ulrich Wehler
 Werner Weidenfeld
 Jens Weidmann
 Karl Weierstrass
 Andreas Weigend
 Robert Weimar
 Jakob von Weizsäcker
 Robert K. von Weizsäcker
 Benedict Welte
 Katrin Wendland
 Guido Westerwelle
 Robert Whytlaw-Gray
 Hermann Wichelhaus
 Max Ernst Wichura
 Ulrich Wickert
 Anna Wienhard
 Leo Wiese
 Ulrich von Wilamowitz-Moellendorff
 Wilhelm II, German Emperor
 Prince Wilhelm of Prussia (1906–1940)
 Léonard Willems
 August Wilmanns
 Max Wilms
 Lewis Strange Wingfield
 Hermann Winnefeld
 Robert Wintgen
 Karl Wirtz
 Rotraut Wisskirchen
 Peter Wittig
 Friedrich Wolf (writer)
 Guntram Wolff
 Albrecht Wolters
 Adolf Wüllner

Y 
 Christos Yannaras

Z 

 Karl Zangemeister
 Ferdinand Zirkel
 Ernst Zitelmann
 Wolf W. Zuelzer
 Nathan Zuntz

References

Bonn
University of Bonn